Dents Run Covered Bridge is a historic covered bridge located near Laurel Point, Monongalia County, West Virginia, United States. It was built in 1889, and spans Dents Run. The bridge is of Kingpost truss construction and measures 12 feet and 10 inches wide and 40 feet long.  By 1981, it was one of only 17 covered bridges left in West Virginia.

It was listed on the National Register of Historic Places in 1981.

References

See also
List of covered bridges in West Virginia

Bridges completed in 1889
Covered bridges on the National Register of Historic Places in West Virginia
Buildings and structures in Monongalia County, West Virginia
National Register of Historic Places in Monongalia County, West Virginia
Road bridges on the National Register of Historic Places in West Virginia
Wooden bridges in West Virginia
King post truss bridges in the United States